The genus Perisoreus is a very small genus of jays from the Boreal regions of North America and Eurasia from Scandinavia to the Asian seaboard. An isolated species also occurs in north-western Sichuan province of China. They belong to the Passerine order of birds in the family Corvidae. Not closely related to other birds known as jays, they are instead related to the genus Cyanopica.

The genus was introduced by the French zoologist Charles Lucien Bonaparte in 1831. The type species was subsequently designated as the Canada jay. The name of the genus may come from the Ancient Greek perisōreuō "to heap up" or "bury beneath". Alternatively it may be from the Latin peri- "very" or "exceedingly" and sorix, a bird of augury dedicated to Saturn.

Species
The genus contains three species.

Notes

References

 
Bird genera
Taxa named by Charles Lucien Bonaparte